Ex vivo (Latin: "out of the living") literally means that which takes place outside an organism. In science, ex vivo refers to experimentation or measurements done in or on tissue from an organism in an external environment with minimal alteration of natural conditions.

A primary advantage of using ex vivo tissues is the ability to perform tests or measurements that would otherwise not be possible or ethical in living subjects. Tissues may be removed in many ways, including in part, as whole organs, or as larger organ systems.

Examples of ex vivo specimen use include:
 bioassays;
 using cancerous cell lines, like DU145 for prostate cancer, in drug testing of anticancer agents; 
 measurements of physical, thermal, electrical, mechanical, optical and other tissue properties, especially in various environments that may not be life-sustaining (for example, at extreme pressures or temperatures);
 realistic models for surgical procedure development;
 investigations into the interaction of different energy types with tissues; or
 as phantoms in imaging technique development.

The term ex vivo means that the samples to be tested have been extracted from the organism. The term in vitro (lit. "within the glass") means the samples to be tested are obtained from a repository. In the case of cancer cells, a strain that would produce favorable results, then grown to produce a control sample and the number of samples required for the number of tests. These two terms are not synonymous even though the testing in both cases is "within the glass".

In cell biology, ex vivo procedures often involve living cells or tissues taken from an organism and cultured in a laboratory apparatus, usually under sterile conditions with no alterations, for up to 24 hours to obtain sufficient cells for the experiments. Experiments generally start after 24 hours of incubation. Using living cells or tissue from the same organism are still considered to be ex vivo. One widely performed ex vivo study is the chick chorioallantoic membrane (CAM) assay. In this assay, angiogenesis is promoted on the CAM membrane of a chicken embryo outside the organism (chicken).

See also 

 Animal testing
 In silico
 In situ
 In utero
 In vitro
 In vivo

References

Latin biological phrases
Latin words and phrases
Animal test conditions